This is a list of Curaçao national football team games in 2013.

2013 games

References

2013
2013 national football team results
2012–13 in Curaçao football
2013–14 in Curaçao football